Rineloricaria eigenmanni is a species of catfish in the family Loricariidae. It is native to South America, where it is known only from Venezuela, with its type locality being listed as near Sarare. The species reaches 10.2 cm (4 inches) in standard length and is believed to be a facultative air-breather. 

Rineloricaria eigenmanni appears in the aquarium trade, where it is sometimes known as the common whiptail catfish.

References 

Loricariidae
Fish described in 1908
Catfish of South America
Fish of Venezuela